Ziliujing District, formerly romanized as Tzuliutsing, is a district of Zigong in Sichuan Province, China.

History
According to Fang, China has always managed salt and iron, with Sichuan containing many salt deposits together with natural gas, especially in Ziliujing. "Invisible gas fire" was mentioned as early as the Han dynasty, gas wells were taxed by 1662, gas was used in one tenth of the salt evaporating plants by 1821 (the remainder using wood or charcoal), and by 1857 gas was the more common fuel. Li Jung describes the infrastructure around the salt business, "the building where money is handled is called the cashier's quarters, that immediately above the well is called the pestle quarters, that where the buffaloes turn the wheel to bring up the brine is called the wheel and buffalo quarters, that where the salt is stored in buckets is called the bucket quarters, that where the brine is evaporated is called the oven quarters. The wells used stone casing for the first hundred feet or so followed by wood for another . Some gas wells serviced up to 700 boilers. Separate pipes carried the brine.

Gallery

See also
 Zigong
 Salt in Chinese history

Notes

References

External links
Ziliujing District Government website

Districts of Sichuan
Zigong